Elections to the French National Assembly were held in French Cameroons on 21 October 1945, with a second round of voting on 18 November. Louis-Paul Aujoulat and Alexandre Douala Manga Bell were elected.

Electoral system
The two seats allocated to the constituency were elected on two separate electoral rolls; French citizens elected one MP from the first college, whilst non-citizens elected one MP in the second college.

Background
The relationship between the French and the African population of Cameroon were poor at the time of the election; the Africans were unenthusiastic about French colonialism and their economic situation. Although trade unions had been legalised in 1944, commercial interests had subsequently formed the Etats Généreaux de la Colonisation Française, which opposed abolishing forced labour. Announcements from the new body infuriated African workers, leading to the strikes starting on 24 September, which turned into full-scale riots. The violence led to the deaths of eight Africans and the secretary of the Chamber of Commerce.

Campaign
Alexandre Douala Manga Bell, chief of the Duala, ran for the second college, but was opposed by Governor Henri Pierre Nicolas. Although some of his supporters were jailed, this only served to increase his popularity.

The first college election was a close race between Louis-Paul Aujoulat, a Catholic missionary, and the candidate representing commercial interests.

Results

First College

Second College

Aftermath
Following the elections, Senegalese MP Lamine Guèye attempted to persuade all the African MPs to form an African Bloc, which would be affiliated with the SFIO. However, the attempt failed, and both Aujoulat and Douala Manga Bell joined the Popular Republican Movement.

References

Cameroon
October 1945 events in Africa
Elections in Cameroon
1945 in French Cameroon
Election and referendum articles with incomplete results
Cameroon